The genus Leptocyon (Greek: leptos slender + cyon dog) includes 11 species and was the first canine. They first appeared in North America around 34 million years ago in the Oligocene at the same time as the Borophaginae with whom they share features, indicating that these were two sister groups. Borophaginae skull and dentition were designed for a powerful killing bite compared with the Leptocyon which were designed for snatching small, fast-moving prey. The species L. delicatus is the smallest canid to have existed. At the close of their genus 9 million years ago one Leptocyon lineage resembled the modern fox.

Leptocyon were small-bodied, fox-like animals with a long, narrow jaw and delicate teeth. They were probably omnivorous, feeding on small animals and fruit in a diet that remained relatively unchanged during the Miocene.

References

Bibliography
 

Prehistoric canines
Miocene canids
Oligocene canids
Prehistoric carnivoran genera
Rupelian genus first appearances
Tortonian genus extinctions
Cenozoic mammals of North America
Whitneyan
Arikareean
Hemingfordian
Barstovian
Clarendonian
Fossil taxa described in 1918